Nunn is a surname. Notable people with the surname include:

 Alf Nunn (1899–1946), English footballer
 Anthony Nunn (born 1927), British field hockey player
 Beau Nunn (born 1995), American football player
 Bill Nunn (1953–2016), American actor
 Bill Nunn (American football) (1924-2014), American journalist and American football scout
 Bobby Nunn (disambiguation), multiple people
 David Nunn (1962–2012), British actor
 David Alexander Nunn (1833–1918), American politician
 Freddie Joe Nunn (born 1962), American former professional football player
 Frederick Nunn (1837–1870), English cricketer
 John Nunn (born 1955), English chess grandmaster
 Judy Nunn (born 1945), Australian actress and author
 Kem Nunn (21st century), American fiction novelist
Kendrick Nunn (born 1995), American professional basketball player
 L. L. Nunn (1853–1925), American entrepreneur and educator
 Louie B. Nunn (1924–2004), American politician
 Michael Nunn (born 1964), American boxer
 Michael Nunn (dancer) (b. 1967), British ballet dancer and choreographer
 Patrick Nunn (21st century), English composer
 Robert Nunn (disambiguation), multiple people
 Ronnie Nunn (21st century), former professional basketball referee
 Sam Nunn (born 1938), American businessman and politician
 Steve Nunn (born 1952), American politician
 Terri Nunn (born 1961), American singer and actress
 Trevor Nunn (born 1940), Olivier Award–winning English theatre director and film director
 Veronica Nunn (born 1957), American jazz singer
 Wally Nunn (1920-1965)), English footballer
 William Nunn (1879–1971), Conservative Party politician in the United Kingdom

See also

Neno (name)

English-language surnames